Oh Blue Christmas is an EP by the American band A Fine Frenzy that was released in November 2009 in the United States by Virgin Records. It was initially released exclusively through Target two months after the release of the band's previous studio album Bomb in a Birdcage. The EP contains cover versions of three popular holiday songs—"Blue Christmas", "Winter Wonderland" and "Christmas Time Is Here" from A Charlie Brown Christmas—as well as three original tracks. According to Alison Sudol, A Fine Frenzy's leader, the collection of songs was recorded in five days at record producer David Bianco's studio in Los Angeles.

The EP—and "Christmas Time Is Here" in particular—received positive critical reception overall. In the United States, Oh Blue Christmas peaked at number 87 on the Billboard 200, at number three on Billboard Top Holiday Albums chart and at number 28 on the Top Rock Albums chart. A Fine Frenzy was touring the United States when Bomb in a Birdcage and Oh Blue Christmas were released.

Composition

Oh Blue Christmas has a duration of approximately 22 minutes and includes renditions of three popular holiday songs: "Blue Christmas" (Billy Hayes, Jay W. Johnson), "Winter Wonderland" (Felix Bernard, Richard B. Smith), and "Christmas Time Is Here" (Vince Guaraldi, Lee Mendelson). The latter originally appeared on the 1965 television special A Charlie Brown Christmas and the soundtrack of the same name. The EP also includes three original tracks; "Redribbon Foxes", "Winter White" and "Wish You Well". Of "Redribbon Foxes", Sudol stated: ...when I was writing it, I was in a cabin covered with snow and it was very quiet outside. This was all in my head, of course. Down a hill there's a little town, all lit up, carolers singing. It's a little bit sad, although it's very beautiful. There's a little fox creeping through the snow, a fox that's very hard to catch.

Sudol said "Winter White" was the "first genuinely heart-achy song" she had ever written and that "Wish You Well" is about a family member. According to Sudol, the group "expand[ed] its sound" by incorporating horns, mandolins and pedal steel guitars. The EP was recorded in five days at record producer David Bianco's studio Dave's Room. in Los Angeles. She said of the recording process:
We all holed up in (producer) David Bianco's lovely studio, which was built in the '70s and hasn't changed much since then—and though it was the sticky, hot LA summer outside, inside, it was snowy, delightful Christmastime. We..[recorded] everything together around an invisible campfire; everyone picking up different instruments and playing them on a moment's notice. There was definitely some holiday magic in the air that week.

Reception

Cory Frye of the Albany Democrat-Herald described Sudol's overall performance as "sultry" and called "Redribbon Foxes" a standout original track. In his review for AllMusic, Andrew Leahey wrote that the cover songs are "perfectly pleasant" and that Sudol's original songs are the highlight of the collection. Leahey complimented Sudol's "lilting, whimsical" performance and said the song "Redribbon Foxes" has a broader appeal. Brian Moore of RedEye, a Chicago Tribune publication, said the EP contained both traditional and indie qualities and described Sudol's voice as "smooth, velvety and well-suited for holiday music". OffBeat Alex Rawls said the EP was more "wintry" than "Christmas-y", more melancholic than celebratory, and only "Wish You Well" evoked a warm, joyous tone. One reviewer for Skope Magazine described the collection as "whimsical".

"Christmas Time Is Here" in particular received positive critical reception. Moore and Rawls called the song the best track on the EP. Rawls called it the collection's "finest moment", having "evocative sounds that swell and recede". Frye described the track as "bone-chilling", and Brandon Ferguson of OC Weekly called it "nostalgia-inducing".

Track listing

Track listing adapted from AllMusic.

Personnel

 Felix Bernard – composer 
 David Bianco – engineer, mixing, producer
 C. J. Camerieri – backing vocals, cornet, French horn, handclapping, trumpet 
 Omar Cowan – acoustic bass, acoustic guitar, backing vocals, bass, electric bass, guitar, handclapping, mandolin
 Cole Gerst – design, illustrations 
 Vince Guaraldi – composer 
 Billy Hayes – composer 
 Ted Jensen – mastering 
 Jay W. Johnson – composer 
 Stephen LeBlanc – backing vocals, chimes, Hammond B3, handclapping, harmonium, piano, Wurlitzer 
 Ryan Lerman – acoustic guitar, backing vocals, double bass, electric guitar, handclapping 
 Lee Mendelson – composer 
 Joshua Sarubin – A&R 
 Jesse Siebenberg – backing vocals, drums, electric guitar, handclapping, percussion 
 Richard B. Smith – composer 
 Alison Sudol – composer, handclapping, piano, producer, vocals 

Credits adapted from AllMusic.

Chart performance
Oh Blue Christmas  charted in the United States, peaking at number 87 on the Billboard 200, at number three on Billboard Top Holiday Albums chart and at number 28 on the Top Rock Albums chart.

References

External links
A Fine Frenzy's official site
 "L.A. Grapevine, October 2008" by Bud Scoppa (Mix magazine, 2008) – David Bianco, Dave's Room

2009 Christmas albums
2009 EPs
A Fine Frenzy albums
Christmas albums by American artists
Christmas EPs
Pop rock Christmas albums
Pop rock EPs
Virgin Records EPs